The 2013 San Francisco Giants season was the Giants' 131st year in Major League Baseball, their fifty-sixth year in San Francisco since their move from New York following the 1957 season, and their fourteenth at AT&T Park. They entered the season as the defending World Series Champions.

Season standings

National League West

National League Wild Card

Record vs. opponents

Events
November 1, 2012: The Giants decline to exercise a club option on IF Aubrey Huff and allow him to become a free agent.
November 14, 2012: The Giants re-sign LHP Jeremy Affeldt to a three-year contract.
November 30, 2012: The Giants tender contracts to arbitration-eligible players IF Joaquín Árias, OF Gregor Blanco, RHP Santiago Casilla, LHP José Mijares, OF Hunter Pence, C Buster Posey and RHP Sergio Romo.  Injured RHP Brian Wilson is non-tendered and becomes a free agent.
December 3, 2012: The Giants re-sign free agent OF Ángel Pagán to a four-year contract.
December 4, 2012: The Giants re-sign free agent IF Marco Scutaro to a three-year contract.
December 13, 2012:  Free agent and former Giant OF Andrés Torres signs with the team on a one-year contract.
January 17–18, 2013: The Giants avoid arbitration with José Mijares, Buster Posey, Hunter Pence, and Gregor Blanco by signing to one-year deals.  
January 25, 2013: The Giants claim INF Tony Abreu off waivers from Kansas City Royals.
February 5, 2013: The Giants avoid arbitration with RHP Sergio Romo by agreeing to a two-year contract.
March 29, 2013: The Giants and C Buster Posey come to terms on an 8-year contract with club option.
March 31, 2013: Spring training concludes with newcomers RHP Chad Gaudin, IF Nick Noonan, and C Guillermo Quiróz added to the 25-man roster.
May 20, 2013: RHP Ryan Vogelsong dislocates and fractures the pinky on his right hand while batting.
May 25, 2013: OF Ángel Pagán hits an inside-the-park walk-off home run in the bottom of the 10th inning to beat the Colorado Rockies 6–5. Pagan is the first MLB player to complete this feat since Rey Sanchez for the Tampa Bay Rays on June 11, 2004, in a 10th-inning victory over the same Colorado Rockies. Pagan is also the first Giants player to do this since Bill Terry did it on August 24, 1931, when the New York Giants defeated the Chicago Cubs 2–1.
June 25, 2013: OF Ángel Pagán undergoes surgery on a torn tendon in his left hamstring, sidelining him for approximately 12 weeks.
 July 2, 2013: The Giants are no-hit by Homer Bailey at Great American Ball Park in a 3–0 loss to the Cincinnati Reds.
July 9, 2013: The Giants sign OF Jeff Francoeur to a minor-league deal, his contract was purchased four days later.
July 13, 2013: RHP Tim Lincecum pitches the 15th no-hitter in Giants history at Petco Park against the San Diego Padres, the first of his career. Lincecum made 148 pitches, the second highest number of pitches in a no-hitter in MLB history, striking out 13 Padres.
July 16, 2013: The 84th MLB All-Star Game takes place with LHP Madison Bumgarner, RHP Sergio Romo and IF Marco Scutaro being selected to their first All-Star rosters, and C Buster Posey to his second.
 August 22, 2013: RHP Matt Cain is struck with a batted ball while pitching, resulting in his being placed on the disabled list for the first time in his career.
 September 3, 2013:  Highly regarded prospect RHP Heath Hembree makes his major league debut in a game at Petco Park.
September 6, 2013: RHP Yusmeiro Petit pitches a one-hit shutout against the Arizona Diamondbacks. Petit was just one strike away from pitching a perfect game before pinch-hitter Eric Chavez singled.
 September 11, 2013: With a victory by the Reds in Cincinnati, the Giants are mathematically eliminated from postseason contention, thus becoming the 13th consecutive team to fail to defend their World Championship.
 September 28, 2013: It is reported that the Giants and OF Hunter Pence have agreed to a 5-year contract extension.
 September 29, 2013: As the regular season concludes, Hunter Pence becomes the first Giant of the San Francisco era to start all 162 games in a season.
 October 22, 2013: RHP Tim Lincecum agrees to a new 2-year contract, avoiding free agency.

Game log and schedule
All schedule and scores taken from MLB.com. 

|- style="text-align:center;" style="background-color:#fbb;"
| 1 || April 1 || @ Dodgers || 0–4 ||Clayton Kershaw (1–0)  || George Kontos (0–1)  || ||53,138||0–1
|- style="text-align:center;" style="background-color:#bfb;"
| 2 || April 2 || @ Dodgers || 3–0 || Madison Bumgarner (1–0) ||Hyun-Jin Ryu (0–1) || Sergio Romo (1) ||45,431 ||1–1
|- style="text-align:center;" style="background-color:#bfb;"
| 3 || April 3 || @ Dodgers || 5–3 || Tim Lincecum (1–0) ||Josh Beckett (0–1) || Sergio Romo (2) ||52,906 ||2–1
|- style="text-align:center;" style="background-color:#bfb"
| 4 || April 5 || Cardinals || 1–0  ||Barry Zito (1–0)||Jake Westbrook (0–1)  || Sergio Romo (3)  || 41,581 ||3–1
|- style="text-align:center;" style="background-color:#fbb;"
| 5 || April 6 || Cardinals || 3–6  ||Shelby Miller (1–0)||Ryan Vogelsong (0–1)  || Mitchell Boggs (1)  || 41,402 ||3–2
|- style="text-align:center;" style="background-color:#fbb;"
| 6 || April 7 || Cardinals || 3–14  ||Adam Wainwright (1–1)||Matt Cain (0–1)  ||  || 42,201 ||3–3
|- style="text-align:center;" style="background-color:#bfb;"
| 7 || April 8 || Rockies || 4–2 || Madison Bumgarner (2–0) ||Jorge de la Rosa (0–1) || Sergio Romo (4) ||41,133 ||4–3
|- style="text-align:center;" style="background-color:#bfb;"
| 8 || April 9 || Rockies || 9–6  ||Santiago Casilla (1–0)  ||Matt Belisle (0–1)  || Sergio Romo (5) ||41,910  || 5–3
|- style="text-align:center;" style="background-color:#bfb;"
| 9 || April 10 || Rockies || 10–0  ||Barry Zito (2–0)  ||Jeff Francis (1–1)  || ||41,606  || 6–3
|- style="text-align:center;" style="background-color:#bfb;"
| 10 || April 11 || @ Cubs || 7–6  ||Ryan Vogelsong (1–1)  ||Scott Feldman (0–2)  || Sergio Romo (6) ||25,460  || 7–3
|- style="text-align:center;" style="background-color:#fbb;"
| 11 || April 12 || @ Cubs || 3–4  ||Kyuji Fujikawa (1–0)  ||Sergio Romo (0–1)  ||  ||30,996  || 7–4
|- style="text-align:center;" style="background-color:#bfb;"
| 12 || April 13 || @ Cubs || 3–2  ||Madison Bumgarner (3–0)  ||Jeff Samardzija (1–2)  || Santiago Casilla (1) ||34,778  || 8–4
|- style="text-align:center;" style="background-color:#bfb;"
| 13 || April 14 || @ Cubs || 10–7 (10) ||George Kontos (1–1)  ||Shawn Camp (0–1)  || Sergio Romo (7) ||33,326  || 9–4
|- style="text-align:center;" style="background-color:#fbb;"
| 14 || April 16 || @ Brewers || 8–10 || Brandon Kintzler (2–0) || Barry Zito (2–1) || Jim Henderson (2) || 29,075 || 9–5
|- style="text-align:center;" style="background-color:#fbb;"
| 15 || April 17 || @ Brewers || 3–4 || Jim Henderson (2–0) || Santiago Casilla (1–1) || || 29,362 || 9–6
|- style="text-align:center;" style="background-color:#fbb;"
| 16 || April 18 || @ Brewers || 2–7 || Yovani Gallardo (1–1) || Matt Cain (0–2) || || 29,161 || 9–7
|- style="text-align:center;" style="background-color:#bfb;"
| 17 || April 19 || Padres || 3–2 || Santiago Casilla (2–1) || Luke Gregerson (1–2) ||  || 41,559 || 10–7
|- style="text-align:center;" style="background-color:#bfb;"
| 18 || April 20 || Padres || 2–0 || Tim Lincecum (2–0) || Andrew Cashner (0–1) || Sergio Romo (8) || 41,995 || 11–7
|- style="text-align:center;" style="background-color:#bfb;"
| 19 || April 21 || Padres || 5–0 || Barry Zito (3–1) || Eric Stults (2–2) ||  || 42,747 || 12–7
|- style="text-align:center;" style="background-color:#bfb;"
| 20 || April 22 || Diamondbacks || 5–4 || Sergio Romo (1–1) || Tony Sipp (1–1) ||  || 41,294 || 13–7
|- style="text-align:center;" style="background-color:#fbb;"
| 21 || April 23 || Diamondbacks || 4–6 (11) || Brad Ziegler (1–0) || Santiago Casilla (2–2) || Matt Reynolds (1) || 41,955 || 13–8
|- style="text-align:center;" style="background-color:#fbb;"
| 22 || April 24 || Diamondbacks || 2–3 (10) || David Hernandez (1–1) || Chad Gaudin (0–1) || Matt Reynolds (2) || 41,756 || 13–9
|- style="text-align:center;" style="background-color:#fbb;"
| 23 || April 26 || @ Padres || 1–2 || Andrew Cashner (1–1) || Tim Lincecum (2–1) || Huston Street (4) || 34,929 || 13–10
|- style="text-align:center;" style="background-color:#fbb;"
| 24 || April 27 || @ Padres || 7–8 (12) || Joe Thatcher (1–0) || Sergio Romo (1–2) ||  || 38,823 || 13–11
|- style="text-align:center;" style="background-color:#fbb;"
| 25 || April 28 || @ Padres || 4–6 || Jason Marquis (2–2) || Ryan Vogelsong (1–2) || Huston Street (5) || 33,722 || 13–12
|- style="text-align:center;" style="background-color:#bfb;"
| 26 || April 29 || @ Diamondbacks || 6–4 || Jean Machi (1–0) || Brad Ziegler (1–1) || Sergio Romo (9) || 18,036 || 14–12
|- style="text-align:center;" style="background-color:#bfb;"
| 27 || April 30 || @ Diamondbacks || 2–1 || Sandy Rosario (1–0) || J. J. Putz (1–1) || Sergio Romo (10) || 20,319 || 15–12
|-

|- style="text-align:center;" style="background-color:#bfb;"
| 28 || May 1 || @ Diamondbacks || 9–6 || George Kontos (2–1) || David Hernandez (1–2)  || Sergio Romo (11) || 21,277 || 16–12
|- style="text-align:center;" style="background-color:#bfb;"
| 29 || May 3 || Dodgers || 2–1 || Sergio Romo (2–2) || Ronald Belisario (2–3)  ||  || 42,113 || 17–12
|- style="text-align:center;" style="background-color:#bfb;"
| 30 || May 4 || Dodgers || 10–9 (10) ||  Santiago Casilla (3–2) || Brandon League (0–1)  ||  || 41,171 || 18–12
|-  style="text-align:center;" style="background-color:#bfb;"
| 31 || May 5 || Dodgers || 4–3 || Matt Cain (1–2) || Hyun-Jin Ryu (3–2) || Sergio Romo (12) || 41,140 || 19–12
|- style="text-align:center;" style="background-color:#fbb;"
| 32 || May 6 || Phillies || 2–6 || Cliff Lee (3–2) || Madison Bumgarner (3–1) ||  || 41,171 || 19–13
|- style="text-align:center;" style="background-color:#fbb;"
| 33 || May 7 || Phillies || 2–6 || Kyle Kendrick (4–1) || Tim Lincecum (2–2) ||  || 41,226 || 19–14
|- style="text-align:center;" style="background-color:#bfb;"
| 34 || May 8 || Phillies || 4–3 (10) || Javier López (1–0) || Antonio Bastardo (1–1) ||  || 41,048 || 20–14
|- style="text-align:center;" style="background-color:#fbb;"
| 35 || May 9 || Braves || 3–6 || Julio Teherán (2–0) || Ryan Vogelsong (1–3) || Craig Kimbrel (11) || 41,365 || 20–15
|- style="text-align:center;" style="background-color:#bfb;"
| 36 || May 10 || Braves || 8–2 || Matt Cain (2–2) || Tim Hudson (4–2) ||  || 41,387 || 21–15
|- style="text-align:center;" style="background-color:#bfb;"
| 37 || May 11 || Braves || 10–1 || Madison Bumgarner (4–1) || Paul Maholm (4–4) ||  || 41,530 || 22–15
|- style="text-align:center;" style="background-color:#bfb;"
| 38 || May 12 || Braves || 5–1 || Tim Lincecum (3–2) || Kris Medlen (1–5) ||  || 42,231 || 23–15
|- style="text-align:center;" style="background-color:#fbb;"
| 39 || May 14 || @ Blue Jays || 6–10 || R. A. Dickey (3–5) || Barry Zito (3–2) || || 31,753 || 23–16
|- style="text-align:center;" style="background-color:#fbb;"
| 40 || May 15 || @ Blue Jays || 3–11 || Ramón Ortiz (1–1) || Ryan Vogelsong (1–4) || || 32,863 || 23–17
|- style="text-align:center;" style="background-color:#bfb;"
| 41 || May 16 || @ Rockies || 8–6 || Matt Cain (3–2) || Jhoulys Chacín (3–3) || Sergio Romo (13) || 33,128 || 24–17
|- style="text-align:center;" style="background-color:#fbb;"
| 42 || May 17 || @ Rockies || 9–10 || Jorge de la Rosa (5–3) || Madison Bumgarner (4–2) || Rafael Betancourt (10) || 43,365 || 24–18
|- style="text-align:center;" style="background-color:#fbb;"
| 43 || May 18 || @ Rockies || 2–10 || Tyler Chatwood (2–0) || Tim Lincecum (3–3) ||  || 41,412 || 24–19
|- style="text-align:center;" style="background-color:#fbb;"
| 44 || May 19 || @ Rockies || 0–5 || Juan Nicasio (4–1) || Barry Zito (3–3) ||  || 47,494 || 24–20
|- style="text-align:center;" style="background-color:#bfb;"
| 45 || May 20 || Nationals || 8–0 || Ryan Vogelsong (2–4) || Zach Duke (0–1) ||  || 41,963 || 25–20
|- style="text-align:center;" style="background-color:#bfb;"
| 46 || May 21 || Nationals || 4–2 (10)  || Jeremy Affeldt (1–0) || Yunesky Maya (0–1) ||  || 41,642 || 26–20
|- style="text-align:center;" style="background-color:#fbb;"
| 47 || May 22 || Nationals || 1–2 (10)  || Tyler Clippard (3–1) || Jeremy Affeldt (1–1) || Rafael Soriano (13) || 41,175 || 26–21
|- style="text-align:center;" style="background-color:#fbb;"
| 48 || May 24 || Rockies || 0–5 || Tyler Chatwood (3–0) || Tim Lincecum (3–4) || || 41,881 || 26–22
|- style="text-align:center;" style="background-color:#bfb;"
| 49 || May 25 || Rockies || 6–5 (10)  || Sergio Romo (3–2) || Rafael Betancourt (1–2) ||  || 41,784 || 27–22
|- style="text-align:center;" style="background-color:#bfb;"
| 50 || May 26 || Rockies || 7–3  || Matt Cain (4–2) || Jon Garland (3–6) ||  || 42,597 || 28–22
|- style="text-align:center;" style="background-color:#fbb;"
| 51 || May 27 || @ Athletics || 1–4 || Dan Straily (3–2) || Madison Bumgarner (4–3) || Grant Balfour (11) || 36,067 || 28–23
|- style="text-align:center;" style="background-color:#fbb;"
| 52 || May 28 || @ Athletics || 3–6 || Jarrod Parker (3–6) || Michael Kickham (0–1) ||  || 35,067 || 28–24
|- style="text-align:center;" style="background-color:#fbb;"
| 53 || May 29 || Athletics || 6–9 || Tommy Milone (5–5) || Tim Lincecum (3–5) || Grant Balfour (12) || 41,512 || 28–25
|- style="text-align:center;" style="background-color:#bfb;"
| 54 || May 30 || Athletics || 5–2 || Barry Zito (4–3) || A.J. Griffin (5–4) || Sergio Romo (14) || 41,250 || 29–25
|- style="text-align:center;" style="background-color:#bbb;"
| 55 || May 31 || @ Cardinals || colspan=7|Game Postponed (rain) (to be made up as a doubleheader on 6/1)
|- style="text-align:center;" style="background-color:#bbffbb;"

|- style="text-align:center;" style="background-color:#fbb;"
| 55 || June 1 || @ Cardinals || 0–8 || Shelby Miller (6–3) || Matt Cain (4–3) ||  || 42,359 || 29–26
|- style="text-align:center;" style="background-color:#fbb;"
| 56 || June 1 || @ Cardinals || 1–7 || Adam Wainwright (8–3) || Madison Bumgarner (4–4) ||  || 42,175 || 29–27
|- style="text-align:center;" style="background-color:#bfb;"
| 57 || June 2 || @ Cardinals || 4–2 || Chad Gaudin (1–1) || Tyler Lyons (2–1) || Sergio Romo (15) || 43,817 || 30–27
|- style="text-align:center;" style="background-color:#bfb;"
| 58 || June 4 || Blue Jays || 2–1 || Tim Lincecum (4–5) || Josh Johnson (0–2) || Sergio Romo (16) || 41,981 || 31–27
|- style="text-align:center;" style="background-color:#fbb;"
| 59 || June 5 || Blue Jays || 0–4 || R. A. Dickey (5–7) || Barry Zito (4–4) || Casey Janssen (12) || 41,559 || 31–28
|- style="text-align:center;" style="background-color:#fbb;"
| 60 || June 7 || @ Diamondbacks || 1–3 || Brad Ziegler (3–1) || Jeremy Affeldt (1–2) || Heath Bell (11) || 37,542 || 31–29
|- style="text-align:center;" style="background-color:#bfb;"
| 61 || June 8 || @ Diamondbacks || 10–5 || Madison Bumgarner (5–4) || Trevor Cahill (3–7) ||  || 44,574 || 32–29
|- style="text-align:center;" style="background-color:#bfb;"
| 62 || June 9 || @ Diamondbacks || 6–2 || Chad Gaudin (2–1) || Tyler Skaggs (1–1) ||  || 38,222 || 33–29
|- style="text-align:center;" style="background-color:#fbb;"
| 63 || June 11 || @ Pirates || 2–8 || Gerrit Cole (1–0) || Tim Lincecum (4–6) || || 30,614 || 33–30
|- style="text-align:center;" style="background-color:#fbb;"
| 64 || June 12 || @ Pirates || 8–12 || Francisco Liriano (5–2) || Barry Zito (4–5) || || 19,966 || 33–31
|- style="text-align:center;" style="background-color:#bfb;"
| 65 || June 13 || @ Pirates || 10–0 || Matt Cain (5–3) || Charlie Morton (0–1) ||  || 22,532 || 34–31
|- style="text-align:center;" style="background-color:#bfb;"
| 66 || June 14 || @ Braves || 6–0 || Madison Bumgarner (6–4) || Kris Medlen (3–7) ||  || 45,833 || 35–31
|- style="text-align:center;" style="background-color:#fbb;"
| 67 || June 15 || @ Braves || 5–6 || Craig Kimbrel (2–1) || Sergio Romo (3–3) || || 47,178 || 35–32
|- style="text-align:center;" style="background-color:#fbb;"
| 68 || June 16 || @ Braves || 0–3 || Julio Teherán (5–3) || Tim Lincecum (4–7) || Craig Kimbrel (19) || 33,681 || 35–33
|- style="text-align:center;" style="background-color:#fbb;"
| 69 || June 17 || Padres || 3–5 (13)  || Nick Vincent (1–0) || José Mijares (0–1) || Huston Street (14) || 41,981 || 35–34
|- style="text-align:center;" style="background-color:#bfb;"
| 70 || June 18 || Padres || 5–4 || Jean Machi (2–0) || Dale Thayer (0–3) || Sergio Romo (17) || 41,884 || 36–34
|- style="text-align:center;" style="background-color:#bfb;"
| 71 || June 19 || Padres || 4–2 || Madison Bumgarner (7–4) || Luke Gregerson (4–3) || Sergio Romo (18) || 41,866 || 37–34
|- style="text-align:center;" style="background-color:#fbb;"
| 72 || June 20 || Marlins || 1–2 || Tom Koehler (1–5) || Jeremy Affeldt (1–3) || Steve Cishek (11) || 41,290 || 37–35
|- style="text-align:center;" style="background-color:#fbb;"
| 73 || June 21 || Marlins || 3–6 || A.J. Ramos (1–2) || Jake Dunning (0–1) || Steve Cishek (12) || 41,490 || 37–36
|- style="text-align:center;" style="background-color:#bfb;"
| 74 || June 22 || Marlins || 2–1 (11)  || Sandy Rosario (2–0) || Mike Dunn (2–2) ||  || 41,683 || 38–36
|- style="text-align:center;" style="background-color:#fbb;"
| 75 || June 23 || Marlins || 2–7 || Nate Eovaldi (1–0) || Matt Cain (5–4) ||  || 41,697 || 38–37
|- style="text-align:center;" style="background-color:#fbb;"
| 76 || June 24 || @ Dodgers || 1–3 || Paco Rodriguez (2–2) || Madison Bumgarner (7–5) || Kenley Jansen (5) || 40,994 || 38–38
|- style="text-align:center;" style="background-color:#fbb;"
| 77 || June 25 || @ Dodgers || 5–6 || Stephen Fife (2–2) || Michael Kickham (0–2) || Paco Rodriguez (1) || 47,193 || 38–39
|- style="text-align:center;" style="background-color:#fbb;"
| 78 || June 26 || @ Dodgers || 2–4 || Clayton Kershaw (6–5) || Tim Lincecum (4–8) || Kenley Jansen (6) || 41,721 || 38–40
|- style="text-align:center;" style="background-color:#fbb;"
| 79 || June 28 || @ Rockies || 1–4 || Jhoulys Chacín (7–3) || Barry Zito (4–6) ||  || 38,428 || 38–41
|- style="text-align:center;" style="background-color:#fbb;"
| 80 || June 29 || @ Rockies || 1–2 || Rafael Betancourt (2–3) || Jeremy Affeldt (1–4) ||  || 44,612 || 38–42
|- style="text-align:center;" style="background-color:#bfb;"
| 81 || June 30 || @ Rockies || 5–2 || Madison Bumgarner (8–5) || Drew Pomeranz (0–1) || Sergio Romo (19) || 41,845 || 39–42
|-

|- style="text-align:center;" style="background-color:#fbb;"
| 82 || July 1 || @ Reds || 1–8 (6) || Bronson Arroyo (7–6) || Michael Kickham (0–3) ||  || 30,702 || 39–43
|- style="text-align:center;" style="background-color:#fbb;"
| 83 || July 2 || @ Reds || 0–3 || Homer Bailey (5–6) || Tim Lincecum (4–9) ||  || 27,509 || 39–44
|- style="text-align:center;" style="background-color:#fbb;"
| 84 || July 3 || @ Reds || 2–3 (11) || J.J. Hoover (2–5) || Javier López (1–1) ||  || 40,757 || 39–45
|- style="text-align:center;" style="background-color:#bbb;"
| --  || July 4 || @ Reds ||colspan=6|PPD, RAIN; rescheduled for July 23 at AT&T Park 
|- style="text-align:center;" style="background-color:#fbb;"
| 85 || July 5 || Dodgers || 2–10 || Hyun-Jin Ryu (7–3) || Matt Cain (5–5) ||  || 41,911 || 39–46
|- style="text-align:center;" style="background-color:#bfb;"
| 86 || July 6 || Dodgers || 4–2 || Madison Bumgarner (9–5) || Stephen Fife (3–3) || Sergio Romo (20) || 41,638 || 40–46
|- style="text-align:center;" style="background-color:#fbb;"
| 87 || July 7 || Dodgers || 1–4 || Clayton Kershaw (8–5) || Sergio Romo (3–4) || Kenley Jansen (9) || 41,094 || 40–47
|- style="text-align:center" style="background-color:#fbb;"
| 88 || July 8 || Mets || 3–4 (16) || Josh Edgin (1–1) || George Kontos (2–2) || Bobby Parnell (16) || 41,497 || 40–48
|- style="text-align:center" style="background-color:#fbb;"
| 89 || July 9 || Mets || 6–10 || Scott Rice (4–5) || José Mijares (0–2) ||  || 41,534 || 40–49
|- style="text-align:center" style="background-color:#fbb;"
| 90 || July 10 || Mets || 2–7 || Zack Wheeler (3–1) || Matt Cain (5–6) ||  || 41,679 || 40–50
|- style="text-align:center" style="background-color:#bfb;"
| 91 || July 11 || @ Padres || 4–2 || Madison Bumgarner (10–5) || Luke Gregerson (4–5) || Sergio Romo (21) || 31,976 || 41–50
|- style="text-align:center" style="background-color:#bfb;"
| 92 || July 12 || @ Padres || 10–1 || Chad Gaudin (3–1) || Sean O'Sullivan (0–1) ||  || 42,361 || 42–50
|- style="text-align:center" style="background-color:#bfb;"
| 93 || July 13 || @ Padres || 9–0 || Tim Lincecum (5–9) || Edinson Vólquez (6–8) ||  || 40,342 || 43–50
|- style="text-align:center" style="background-color:#fbb;"
| 94 || July 14 || @ Padres || 1–10 || Eric Stults (8–7) || Barry Zito (4–7) ||  || 33,243 || 43–51
|- style="text-align:center" style="background-color:#bfb;"
| 95 || July 19 || Diamondbacks || 2–0 || Chad Gaudin (4–1) || Ian Kennedy (3–7) || Sergio Romo (22) || 41,924 || 44–51
|- style="text-align:center" style="background-color:#bfb;"
| 96 || July 20 || Diamondbacks || 4–3 || Matt Cain (6–6) || Wade Miley (6–8) || Sergio Romo (23) || 41,742 || 45–51
|- style="text-align:center" style="background-color:#fbb;"
| 97 || July 21 || Diamondbacks || 1–3 || Randall Delgado (2–3) || Madison Bumgarner (10–6) || Brad Ziegler (4) || 41,949 || 45–52
|- style="text-align:center" style="background-color:#fbb;"
| 98 || July 22 || Reds || 0–11 || Bronson Arroyo (9–7) || Tim Lincecum (5–10) || || 41,797 || 45–53
|- style="text-align:center" style="background-color:#fbb;"
| 100 || July 23 || Reds || 3–9 || Tony Cingrani (4–1) || Eric Surkamp (0–1) || || || 45–54
|- style="text-align:center" style="background-color:#bfb;"
| 101 || July 23 || @ Reds    || 5–3 || Santiago Casilla (4–2) || Greg Reynolds (0–1) || Sergio Romo (24) || 42,310 || 46–54
|- style="text-align:center" style="background-color:#fbb;"
| 101 || July 24 || Reds || 3–8 || Mike Leake (10–4) || Chad Gaudin (4–2) || || 41,512 || 46–55
|- style="text-align:center" style="background-color:#fbb;"
| 102 || July 26 || Cubs || 2–3 || Matt Guerrier (4–4) || Sergio Romo (3–5) || Kevin Gregg (20) || 41,797 || 46–56
|- style="text-align:center" style="background-color:#fbb;"
| 103 || July 27 || Cubs || 0–1 || Pedro Strop (1–3) || Sergio Romo (3–6) || Kevin Gregg (21) || 41,953 || 46–57
|- style="text-align:center" style="background-color:#fbb;"
| 104 || July 28 || Cubs || 1–2 || Travis Wood (7–7) || Tim Lincecum (5–11) || Kevin Gregg (22) || 41,608 || 46–58
|- style="text-align:center" style="background-color:#fbb;"
| 105 || July 30 || @ Phillies || 3–7 || John Lannan (3–4) || Barry Zito (4–8) || || 36,492 || 46–59
|- style="text-align:center" style="background-color:#bfb;"
| 106 || July 31 || @ Phillies || 9–2 || Chad Gaudin (5–2) || Kyle Kendrick (9–8) || || 34,067 || 47–59
|-

|- style="text-align:center" style="background-color:#bfb;"
| 107 || August 1 || @ Phillies || 2–1 || Matt Cain (7–6) || Jonathan Papelbon (2–1) || Sergio Romo (25) || 33,645 || 48–59
|- style="text-align:center" style="background-color:#bfb;"
| 108 || August 2 || @ Rays || 4–1 || Madison Bumgarner (11–6) || Chris Archer (6–4) || Sergio Romo (26) || 20,144 || 49–59
|- style="text-align:center" style="background-color:#fbb;"
| 109 || August 3 || @ Rays || 1–2 (10) || Fernando Rodney (4–2) || Jean Machi (2–1) || || 31,969 || 49–60
|- style="text-align:center" style="background-color:#fbb;"
| 110 || August 4 || @ Rays || 3–4 || Alex Torres (4–0) || José Mijares (0–3) ||Fernando Rodney (27) || 34,078 || 49–61
|- style="text-align:center" style="background-color:#bfb;"
| 111 || August 5 || Brewers || 4–2 || Santiago Casilla (5–2) || John Axford (5–5) || Sergio Romo (27) || 42,217 || 50–61
|- style="text-align:center" style="background-color:#fbb;"
| 112 || August 6 || Brewers || 1–3 || Wily Peralta (8–11) || Matt Cain (7–7) || Jim Henderson (16) || 41,426 || 50–62
|- style="text-align:center" style="background-color:#fbb;"
| 113 || August 7 || Brewers || 1–6 || Alfredo Fígaro (2–3) || Madison Bumgarner (11–7) ||  || 41,416 || 50–63
|- style="text-align:center" style="background-color:#bfb;"
| 114 || August 8 || Brewers || 4–1 || Tim Lincecum (6–11) || Donovan Hand (0–4) || || 41,219 || 51–63
|- style="text-align:center" style="background-color:#fbb;"
| 115 || August 9 || Orioles || 2–5 (10) || Jim Johnson (3–7) || Javier López (1–2) || Tommy Hunter (3) || 41,434 || 51–64
|- style="text-align:center" style="background-color:#bfb;"
| 116 || August 10 || Orioles || 3–2 || Guillermo Moscoso (1–0) || Wei-Yin Chen (6–5) || Sergio Romo (28) || 41,315 || 52–64
|- style="text-align:center" style="background-color:#fbb;"
| 117 || August 11 || Orioles || 2–10 || Troy Patton (2–0) || Matt Cain (7–8) ||  || 41,622 || 52–65
|- style="text-align:center" style="background-color:#fbb;"
| 118 || August 13 || @ Nationals || 2–4 || Tanner Roark (1–0) || Guillermo Moscoso (1–1) || Rafael Soriano (30) || 27,304 || 52–66
|- style="text-align:center" style="background-color:#fbb;"
| 119 || August 14 || @ Nationals || 5–6 || Jordan Zimmermann (14–6) || Tim Lincecum (6–12) || Rafael Soriano (31) || 30,657 || 52–67
|- style="text-align:center" style="background-color:#bfb;"
| 120 || August 15 || @ Nationals || 4–3 || Javier López (2–2) || Rafael Soriano (2–3) || Sergio Romo (29) || 36,719 || 53–67
|- style="text-align:center" style="background-color:#bfb;"
| 121 || August 16 || @ Marlins || 14–10 || Sandy Rosario (3–0) || Nate Eovaldi (2–3) ||  || 26,166 || 54–67
|- style="text-align:center" style="background-color:#bfb;"
| 122 || August 17 || @ Marlins || 6–4 || Matt Cain (8–8) || Henderson Álvarez (2–2) || Sergio Romo (30) || 24,653 || 55–67
|- style="text-align:center" style="background-color:#fbb;"
| 123 || August 18 || @ Marlins || 5–6 || Chad Qualls (4–1) || Sandy Rosario (3–1) || Steve Cishek (27) || 23,113 || 55–68
|- style="text-align:center" style="background-color:#fbb;"
| 124 || August 19 || Red Sox || 0–7 || Jon Lester (11–7) || Tim Lincecum (6–13) || || 41,585 || 55–69
|- style="text-align:center" style="background-color:#bfb;"
| 125 || August 20 || Red Sox || 3–2 || Sergio Romo (4–6) || Franklin Morales (2–1) ||  || 41,551 || 56–69
|- style="text-align:center" style="background-color:#fbb;"
| 126 || August 21 || Red Sox || 1–12 || Félix Doubront (9–6) || Barry Zito (4–9) || || 41,532 || 56–70
|- style="text-align:center" style="background-color:#fbb;"
| 127 || August 22 || Pirates || 5–10 || Jeanmar Gómez (3–0) || Guillermo Moscoso (1–2) || || 41,733 || 56–71
|- style="text-align:center" style="background-color:#fbb;"
| 128 || August 23 || Pirates || 1–3 || Charlie Morton (5–3) || Madison Bumgarner (11–8) || Mark Melancon (9) || 41,583 || 56–72
|- style="text-align:center" style="background-color:#bfb;"
| 129 || August 24 || Pirates || 6–3 || Tim Lincecum (7–13) || Francisco Liriano (14–6) || Sergio Romo (31) || 42,059 || 57–72
|- style="text-align:center" style="background-color:#bfb;"
| 130 || August 25 || Pirates || 4–0 || Ryan Vogelsong (3–4) || A. J. Burnett (6–9) || || 41,815 || 58–72
|- style="text-align:center" style="background-color:#fbb;"
| 131 || August 26 || @ Rockies || 1–6 || Juan Nicasio (8–6) || Barry Zito (4–10) || || 30,364 || 58–73
|- style="text-align:center" style="background-color:#bfb;"
| 132 || August 27 || @ Rockies || 5–3 || Yusmeiro Petit (1–0) || Chad Bettis (0–3) || Sergio Romo (32) || 26,601 || 59–73
|- style="text-align:center" style="background-color:#fbb;"
| 133 || August 28 || @ Rockies || 4–5 || Jhoulys Chacín (13–7) || Madison Bumgarner (11–9) || Rex Brothers (14) || 27,268 || 59–74
|- style="text-align:center" style="background-color:#bfb;"
| 134 || August 30 || @ Diamondbacks || 1–0 || Tim Lincecum (8–13) || Randall Delgado (4–5) || Sergio Romo (33) || 24,380 || 60–74
|- style="text-align:center" style="background-color:#fbb;"
| 135 || August 31 || @ Diamondbacks || 3–4 || Brad Ziegler (8–1) || Sandy Rosario (3–2) || || 36,091 || 60–75
|-

|- style="text-align:center" style="background-color:#bfb;"
| 136 || September 1 || @ Diamondbacks || 8–2 || Yusmeiro Petit (2–0) || Patrick Corbin (13–5) || || 33,422 || 61–75
|- style="text-align:center" style="background-color:#fbb;"
| 137 || September 2 || @ Padres || 1–4 || Ian Kennedy (6–9) || Barry Zito (4–11) || Huston Street (26) || 25,430 || 61–76
|- style="text-align:center" style="background-color:#fbb;"
| 138 || September 3 || @ Padres || 2–3 || Tim Stauffer (3–1) || Jake Dunning (0–2) || Huston Street (27) || 19,889 || 61–77
|- style="text-align:center" style="background-color:#bfb;"
| 139 || September 4 || @ Padres || 13–5 || Tim Lincecum (9–13) || Eric Stults (8–13) || || 15,762 || 62–77
|- style="text-align:center" style="background-color:#fbb;"
| 140 || September 5 || Diamondbacks || 2–4 || Trevor Cahill (6–10) || Ryan Vogelsong (3–5) || Brad Ziegler (8) || 41,193 || 62–78
|- style="text-align:center" style="background-color:#bfb;"
| 141 || September 6 || Diamondbacks || 3–0 || Yusmeiro Petit (3–0) || Patrick Corbin (13–6) || || 41,180 || 63–78
|- style="text-align:center" style="background-color:#fbb;"
| 142 || September 7 || Diamondbacks || 1–2 || Brandon McCarthy (4–9) || Matt Cain (8–9) || Brad Ziegler (9) || 41,076 || 63–79
|- style="text-align:center" style="background-color:#bfb;"
| 143 || September 8 || Diamondbacks || 3–2 (11) || Javier López (3–2) || Joe Thatcher (3–2) || || 41,050 || 64–79
|- style="text-align:center" style="background-color:#bfb;"
| 144 || September 9 || Rockies || 3–2 (10) || Santiago Casilla (6–2) || Adam Ottavino (1–3) ||  || 41,078 || 65–79
|- style="text-align:center" style="background-color:#fbb;"
| 145 || September 10 || Rockies || 8–9 || Wilton López (3–4) || Sergio Romo (4–7) || Rex Brothers (16) || 41,171 || 65–80
|- style="text-align:center" style="background-color:#bfb;"
| 146 || September 11 || Rockies || 4–3 || Guillermo Moscoso (2–2) || Matt Belisle (5–7) || Santiago Casilla (2) || 41,128 || 66–80
|- style="text-align:center" style="background-color:#fbb;"
| 147 || September 12 || @ Dodgers || 2–3 (10) || Brian Wilson (2–1) || Jeremy Affeldt (1–5) ||  || 53,393 || 66–81
|- style="text-align:center" style="background-color:#bfb;"
| 148 || September 13 || @ Dodgers || 4–2 || Madison Bumgarner (12–9) || Clayton Kershaw (14–9) || Sergio Romo (34) || 52,650 || 67–81
|- style="text-align:center" style="background-color:#bfb;"
| 149 || September 14 || @ Dodgers || 19–3 || Tim Lincecum (10–13) || Ricky Nolasco (13–10) || || 53,062 || 68–81
|- style="text-align:center" style="background-color:#bfb;"
| 150 || September 15 || @ Dodgers || 4–3 || Jean Machi (3–1) || Paco Rodriguez (3–3) || Sergio Romo (35) || 47,302 || 69–81
|- style="text-align:center" style="background-color:#bfb;"
| 151 || September 17 || @ Mets || 8–5 || Yusmeiro Petit (4–0) || Sean Henn (0–1) || || 24,343 || 70–81
|- style="text-align:center" style="background-color:#fbb;"
| 152 || September 18 || @ Mets || 4–5 || Vic Black (2–0) || Sergio Romo (4–8) ||  || 23,698 || 70–82
|- style="text-align:center" style="background-color:#bfb;"
| 153 || September 19 || @ Mets || 2–1 || Madison Bumgarner (13–9) || Jon Niese (7–8) || Javier López (1) || 22,897 || 71–82
|- style="text-align:center" style="background-color:#fbb;"
| 154 || September 20 || @ Yankees || 1–5 || CC Sabathia (14–13) || Tim Lincecum (10–14) ||  || 41,734 || 71–83
|- style="text-align:center" style="background-color:#fbb;"
| 155 || September 21 || @ Yankees || 0–6 || Iván Nova (9–5) || Ryan Vogelsong (3–6) ||  || 42,420 || 71–84
|- style="text-align:center" style="background-color:#bfb;"
| 156 || September 22 || @ Yankees || 2–1 || Javier López (4–2) || Andy Pettitte (10–11) || Sergio Romo (36) || 49,197 || 72–84
|- style="text-align:center" style="background-color:#fbb;"
| 157 || September 24 || Dodgers || 1–2 || Hyun-Jin Ryu (14–7) || Matt Cain (8–10) || Kenley Jansen (28) || 41,625 || 72–85
|- style="text-align:center" style="background-color:#bfb;"
| 158 || September 25 || Dodgers || 6–4 || Barry Zito (5–11) || Ricky Nolasco (13–11) || Sergio Romo (37) || 41,377 || 73–85
|- style="text-align:center" style="background-color:#bfb;"
| 159 || September 26 || Dodgers || 3–2 || Santiago Casilla (7–2) || Paco Rodriguez (3–4) || Sergio Romo (38) || 41,221 || 74–85
|- style="text-align:center" style="background-color:#bfb;"
| 160 || September 27 || Padres || 7–3 || Ryan Vogelsong (4–6) || Burch Smith (1–3) ||  || 41,103 || 75–85
|- style="text-align:center" style="background-color:#fbb;"
| 161 || September 28 || Padres || 3–9 || Eric Stults (11–13) || Yusmeiro Petit (4–1) ||  || 41,201 || 75–86
|- style="text-align:center" style="background-color:#bfb;"
| 162 || September 29 || Padres || 7–6 || Sergio Romo (5–8) || Huston Street (2–5) ||  || 41,495 || 76–86
|-

Roster

Batting
Stats in bold are team leaders. Pitchers are not included in the list.

Note: G = Games played; AB = At bats; R = Runs scored; H = Hits; 2B = Doubles; 3B = Triples; HR = Home runs; RBI = Runs batted in; AVG = Batting average; OBP = On-base percentage; SLG = Slugging percentage; OPS = On-base + Slugging percentage SB = Stolen bases

Pitching

Note: W = Wins; L = Losses; ERA = Earned run average; G = Games pitched; GS = Games started; SV = Saves; IP = Innings pitched; H = Hits allowed; ER = Earned runs allowed; HR = Home runs allowed; BB = Walks allowed; K = Strikeouts

Farm system

LEAGUE CHAMPIONS: AZL Giants

Notes

References

External links

2013 San Francisco Giants season
2013 San Francisco Giants season at Baseball Reference

San Francisco Giants
San Francisco Giants seasons
San Francisco Giants
2013 in San Francisco